The Solander Islands / Hautere are three uninhabited volcanic islets toward the western end of the Foveaux Strait just beyond New Zealand's South Island. The Māori name Hautere translates into English as "flying wind". The islands measure . Administratively, the islands form part of Southland District, making them the only uninhabited outlying island group of New Zealand to be part of a local authority.

The islands are the tip of a larger submerged volcano, roughly equivalent in size to Mount Taranaki. It was formerly believed that the volcano last erupted roughly 2 million years ago, but in 2008 radiometric dating of rock samples from the island found that it was between 150,000 and 400,000 years old.

Islands
It is wooded except for its northeast end, mainly a bare, white rock. A deep cave is on the east side, Sealers Cave. It has a barren appearance and is guano-covered.

History

The island chain was sighted by Captain James Cook on 11 March 1770 and named by him after the Swedish naturalist Daniel Solander, one of the scientific crew aboard Cook's ship, Endeavour.

The islands are geographically forbidding and weather conditions often confound the approach of ships, dissuading attempts at permanent habitation. Australian sealers briefly made use of the islands during the early 19th century, likely living on small flats between the island's cliffs and its shoreline for stints of a few months. Castaways would occasionally end up on the islands, and in 1813, a passing ship bound for Stewart Island found five men in need of rescue. The men – four Europeans and one Australian aboriginal – were marooned there between 1808 and 1813, representing the longest continuous period of habitation on the islands. They are thought to have been left ashore in two groups for seal hunting (sealing), but the sea prevented the approach of any ship to recover them. In 1810, sealing moved to Macquarie Island, farther to the west, and they were effectively abandoned. When rediscovered in 1813, it is likely that they had amassed many dried seal pelts.

Geology
The islands are remnants of an isolated extinct trachyandesite and andesite Pleistocene volcano whose volcanics have geochemical affinities with modern adakites. Their age is 150 to 400 thousand years old, backed up by pollen data, with in one set of analysis the eruptives having a mean age of 344 ± 10 ka and another mean age of 247 ± 8 ka. In both cases the youngest subsample ages are the same at 150,000 years ago. Therefore, the islands are included in the New Zealand Outlying Islands.

The islands are the only volcanic land in New Zealand recently related to the subduction of the Australian Plate beneath the Pacific Plate along the Puysegur Trench, which extends southwards from the end of the Alpine Fault. The current estimated rate of subduction is 35–36 mm per year.  The Solander Basin Mesozoic continental basement rock consists of diorite and subordinate gabbro overlaid by Oligocene to Pliocene sediment.

Flora and fauna
There are 53 vascular plant species, one third of which are very rare. The flora is dominated by ferns and orchids.  The southern, and nominate, subspecies of Buller's albatross (Thalassarche b. bulleri) breeds only on the Solanders and the Snares.

The Solander Islands were historically a well-known area for migrating whales, especially southern right and sperm whales. Sperm whales in this area were said to be exceptionally large.

Bird life
The islands are home to a variety of bird life.

The Solander group has been identified as an Important Bird Area (IBA) by BirdLife International because of its significance as a breeding site for Buller's albatrosses (with about 5000 pairs) and common diving petrels.

See also

 New Zealand outlying islands
 List of islands of New Zealand
 List of islands
 Desert island

References

External links
 Geology
 Botany
 Fauna (Albatrosses)
 Nautical information
 NZ map viewer
 photo

Islands of Southland, New Zealand
New Zealand outlying islands
Volcanoes of the New Zealand outlying islands
Pleistocene volcanoes
Extinct volcanoes
Important Bird Areas of New Zealand
Volcanic islands of New Zealand
Uninhabited islands of New Zealand
Foveaux Strait
Islands of the New Zealand outlying islands